Saint George is an unincorporated community in Greene County, Virginia, United States.
Saint George is home to the Blue Ridge School.

References
GNIS reference

Unincorporated communities in Greene County, Virginia
Unincorporated communities in Virginia